Paraguraleus lucidus is a species of sea snail, a marine gastropod mollusk in the family Mangeliidae.

Description

Distribution
This marine species occurs off Queensland and New South Wales, Australia.

References

 Laseron, C. 1954. Revision of the New South Wales Turridae (Mollusca). Australian Zoological Handbook. Sydney : Royal Zoological Society of New South Wales 1-56, pls 1-12.

External links
 
 View Atlas of Living Australia: Antiguraleus lucidus

lucidus
Gastropods described in 1954
Gastropods of Australia